Volodymyr Bezubyak (born 23 March 1957 in Lviv) is a former Ukrainian and Soviet football coach as well as former professional midfielder.

Career
In early 2016, he worked a senior coach performed functions of de facto senior team head coach for FC Karpaty Lviv along with Oleh Luzhnyi who was head coach de jure.

References

External links
 Profile at Official FC Metalurh Site (Rus)
 Profile at FFU Official Site (Ukr)

1957 births
Living people
Sportspeople from Lviv
Lviv State University of Physical Culture alumni
Soviet footballers
Ukrainian footballers
Ukrainian football managers
Soviet football managers
FC Karpaty Lviv players
FC Podillya Khmelnytskyi players
Academic staff of the Lviv State University of Physical Culture
FC Karpaty-2 Lviv managers
Ukrainian Premier League managers
FC Karpaty Lviv managers

Association football midfielders